The year 2009 is the 8th year in the history of the Universal Reality Combat Championship, a mixed martial arts promotion based in the Philippines. In 2009 the URCC held 7 events beginning with, URCC Baguio: Rumble in the Highlands.

Events list

URCC Baguio: Rumble in the Highlands

URCC Baguio: Rumble in the Highlands was an event held on March 7, 2009 at the Baguio Convention Center in Baguio, Philippines.

Results

URCC 14: Aggression

URCC 14: Aggression was an event held on July 18, 2009 at A.Venue Events Hall in Makati, Metro Manila, Philippines.

Results

URCC Cebu 4: Proving Ground

URCC Cebu 4: Proving Ground was an event held on June 20, 2009 in Mandaue City, Cebu, Philippines.

Results

URCC Davao Digmaan 2009

URCC Davao Digmaan 2009 was an event held on August 23, 2009 at The Davao Convention Center in Davao City, Philippines.

Results

URCC Bacolod Brawl 2009

URCC Bacolod Brawl 2009 was an event held on October 17, 2009 at The West Negros Gym in Negros Occidental, Philippines.

Results

URCC: Rouge Magazine's Black Tie Brawl 2009

URCC: Rouge Magazine's Black Tie Brawl 2009 was an event held on October 24, 2009 at The Ranaissance Hotel Makati in Makati, Metro Manila, Philippines.

Results

URCC 15: Onslaught

URCC 15: Onslaught was an event held on November 21, 2009 at The World Trade Center in Pasay, Metro Manila, Philippines.

Results

See also
 Universal Reality Combat Championship

References

Universal Reality Combat Championship events
2009 in mixed martial arts